Kim Won-Tak (born July 21, 1964) is a South Korean long-distance runner who competed in the late 1980s.

Biography

He is best known for his role at the opening ceremony of the 1988 Summer Olympics in Seoul, when he shared the lighting of the Olympic Flame with fellow South Koreans Chung Sun-Man and Sohn Kee-Chung.

Kim also competed in those same games, finishing 18th in the men's marathon event.

Achievements

References
 

1964 births
Athletes (track and field) at the 1988 Summer Olympics
Living people
Olympic athletes of South Korea
South Korean male marathon runners
Asian Games medalists in athletics (track and field)
Olympic cauldron lighters
Athletes (track and field) at the 1990 Asian Games
South Korean male long-distance runners
Asian Games gold medalists for South Korea
Medalists at the 1990 Asian Games
20th-century South Korean people